As a nickname, Killer or The Killer may refer to:

People known as Killer 

 Pietro Aurino (born 1977), Italian former boxer
 Keegan Brown (born 1992), English darts player
 Fred Burke (1893–1940), American armed robber and contract killer
 Clive Caldwell (1910–1994), Australian World War II flying ace
 Doug Gilmour (born 1963), Canadian retired National Hockey League player
 Mack Gray (1905–1981), American actor
 Derek Hales (born 1951), English former footballer
 Kevin Kaminski (born 1969), Canadian former National Hockey League player called "Killer Kaminski"
 Arthur Kane (1949–2004), American bass guitarist for the glam rock band the New York Dolls
 Harmon Killebrew (1936–2011), American Major League Baseball player
 Katlego Mphela (born 1984), footballer

People known as The Killer 
 Jesús Chávez (born 1972), Mexican boxer nicknamed "El Matador" ("The Killer")
 Danilo Di Luca (born 1976), professional cyclist nicknamed "The Killer from Spoltore"
 Jerry Lee Lewis (born 1935), American rock-and-roll and country music singer/pianist
 Christiaan Lindemans (1912–1946), Dutch double agent who worked for both sides in the Second World War, known as "le Tueur" ("the Killer")

See also

 Christos Dimopoulos (born 1958), Greek retired footballer nicknamed Φονιάς ("Fonias", meaning "Killer") 

Lists of people by nickname